The Belt and Road Forum for International Cooperation (also known as the Belt and Road Forum or BRFIC) is an international political and economical forum of the Belt and Road Initiative.

2017 
The first event was on 14 and 15 May 2017 in Beijing, and drew 29 foreign heads of state and government and representatives from more than 130 countries and 70 international organizations.

Agenda and activities 
The purpose of the forum is described by Wang Xiaotao, deputy head of the National Development and Reform Commission, in an interview with Xinhua as building "a more open and efficient international cooperation platform; a closer, stronger partnership network; and to push for a more just, reasonable and balanced international governance system." Western media coverage portrays the forum in a similar way with CNN referring to the event under the headline "China's new world order" and the Los Angeles Times running the article "Globalization 2.0: How China's two-day summit aims to shape a new world order".

The forum will be a platform for working out action plans for implementation of the initiative in the areas of infrastructure, energy and resources, production capacity, trade and investment and identification of major projects. It is also intended to be an opportunity for the signing of cooperation agreements with countries and international organizations in the areas of financial cooperation mechanism; a cooperation platform for science, technology and environmental protection; and enhanced exchanges and training of talent and financing agreements for backing projects.

Attendance 

Heads of state and government

 People's Republic of China (Host):
 President Xi Jinping
 Premier Li Keqiang
Vice-Premier Zhang Gaoli

The forum is attended by 29 foreign heads of state and government and their respective delegations:

 Prime Minister Beata Szydło of Poland
 Prime Minister Viktor Orbán of Hungary
 Prime Minister Aleksandar Vučić of Serbia
 Prime Minister Alexis Tsipras of Greece
 Prime Minister Paolo Gentiloni of Italy
 Prime Minister Mariano Rajoy of Spain
 Prime Minister Hailemariam Desalegn of Ethiopia
 Prime Minister Nawaz Sharif of Pakistan
 Prime Minister Ranil Wickremesinghe of Sri Lanka
 Prime Minister Jargaltulga Erdenebat of Mongolia
 Prime Minister Hun Sen of Cambodia
 Prime Minister Mahathir bin Mohamad of Malaysia
 Prime Minister Josaia Voreqe Bainimarama of Fiji
 State Counsellor Aung San Suu Kyi of Myanmar
 President Rodrigo Duterte of the Philippines
 President Trần Đại Quang of Vietnam
 President Joko Widodo of Indonesia
 President Bounnhang Vorachith of Laos
 President Uhuru Kenyatta of Kenya
 President Vladimir Putin of Russia
 President Alexander Lukashenko of Belarus
 President Nursultan Nazarbayev of Kazakhstan
 President Shavkat Mirziyoyev of Uzbekistan
 President Almazbek Atambayev of Kyrgyzstan
 President Recep Tayyip Erdoğan of Turkey
 President Miloš Zeman of the Czech Republic
 President Doris Leuthard of Switzerland
 President Mauricio Macri of Argentina
 President Michelle Bachelet of Chile

Heads of international organizations
  Secretary-General of the United Nations, António Guterres
  World Bank President, Jim Yong Kim
  Managing director of the International Monetary Fund, Christine Lagarde
 Director-General of the International Renewable Energy Agency, Adnan Z. Amin
 Executive Chairman of the World Economic Forum, Klaus Schwab
 President of the United Nations General Assembly, Peter Thomson
 Secretary General of the European Bank for Reconstruction and Development, Enzo Quattrociocche
 Interpol Secretary General Jürgen Stock
 Director General of the World Trade Organization Roberto Azevêdo
  Director-General of UNESCO Irina Bokova
  Secretary General of CIS Sergei Lebedev
 Director General of the World Health Organization Margaret Chan

Ministerial level
The online magazine The Diplomat documents the following incomplete list of ministerial level attendees.

 : Unspecified minister-level delegation
 : Trade Minister Steven Ciobo
 : Economy Minister Shahin Mustafayev
 : Unspecified minister-level delegation
 : Secretary for Strategic Affairs Hussein Ali Kalout
 : Minister of External Economic Relations Kim Yong-jae
 : Trade and Industry Minister Tarek Kabil
 : Parliament Secretary General Klaus Welle
 : Minister of Transport and Communications Anne Berner
 : Former Prime Minister, Member of the French Senate Jean-Pierre Raffarin
 : Minister of Economic Affairs and Energy Brigitte Zypries
 : Minister of Economy and Finance Ali Tayebnia
 : unspecificed minister-level delegation
 : Minister of the Amiri Diwan Affairs Sheikh Nasser Sabah Al-Ahmad Al-Jaber
 : Economic Minister Mohamed Saeed
 : Deputy Prime Minister and Finance Minister Krishna Bahadur Mahara
 :  Science and Innovation Minister Paul Goldsmith
 : Minister of Transport and Communications Jassim Saif Ahmed Al Sulaiti
 : Deputy Prime Minister and Minister of Environment Gratiela Gavrilescu
 : Minister of Energy, Industry, and Mineral Resources Khalid A. Al-Falih
 : Minister for National Development and Second Minister for Finance Lawrence Wong
 : National Assembly member Park Byeoung-seug
 : unspecificed minister-level delegation
 : Minister of Foreign Affairs Don Pramudwinai, Minister of Transportation Arkhom Termpittayapaisith, Minister of Commerce Apiradi Tantraporn, Minister of Digital for Economy and Society Pichet Durongkaveroj, and Minister of Science and Technology Atchaka Sibunruang
 : Minister in the Office of the Prime Minister and Minister in the Ministry of the Attorney General and Legal Affairs Stuart Young
 : Culture Minister Mohamed Zine El-Abidine
 : Unspecified ministerial-level delegation
 : Minister of State and Group CEO of ADNOC Dr. Sultan Ahmed Al Jaber
 : Chancellor of the Exchequer Philip Hammond
 : delegation led by White House adviser Matt Pottinger.
 : delegation led by Toshihiro Nikai, secretary-general of the ruling party Liberal Democratic Party.

Venues 
In 2017, the events were held at National Convention Center in the urban Chaoyang District and Yanqi Lake International Convention Center and Jixian hall at Yanqi Lake Conference Center in the outer suburb Huairou District.

2019 
A second Belt and Road Forum was held from 25 to 27 April 2019 in Beijing. Thirty-seven heads of state attended the second BRFIC, as did about five thousand other representatives.

References

External links 

 

Belt and Road Initiative
Foreign relations of China
2017 in China
2010s in Beijing
Diplomatic conferences in China
21st-century diplomatic conferences